The Richard-Riemerschmid-Berufskolleg is a secondary school in the southern half of the German city of Cologne. It is notable for being named after the architect and designer Richard Riemerschmid.

High schools in Germany
Buildings and structures in Cologne
Education in Cologne